There have been three baronetcies created for persons with the surname Dryden, one in the Baronetage of England and two in the Baronetage of Great Britain. Two of the creations are extant and are joined under a single holder since 1874.

The Dryden Baronetcy, of Canons Ashby in the County of Northampton, was created in the Baronetage of England on 16 November 1619 for Erasmus Dryden, subsequently Member of Parliament for Banbury. The second Baronet represented Northamptonshire in the House of Commons. The title became extinct on the death of the seventh Baronet in 1770. However, the title was revived in 1795 (see below).

The poet John Dryden was the grandson of the first Baronet and father of the fifth.

The Turner, later Page-Turner, later Dryden Baronetcy, of Ambrosden in the County of Oxford, was created in the Baronetage of Great Britain on 24 August 1733 for Edward Turner. The second Baronet sat as Member of Parliament for Great Bedwyn, Oxfordshire and Penrhyn. His second son John was created a baronet, of Canons-Ashby, in his own right in 1795 (see below). The third Baronet represented Thirsk in the House of Commons. In 1775 he inherited substantial estates on the death of his great-uncle Sir Gregory Page, 2nd Baronet and assumed the additional surname of Page. The surname of Page-Turner was also borne by the fourth, fifth Baronets and sixth Baronets. On the latter's death in 1874 the title was inherited by Sir Henry Edward Leigh Dryden, 4th Baronet, of Canons Ashby (see below). The titles have remained united ever since.

The Dryden Baronetcy, of Canons Ashby in the County of Northampton, was created in the Baronetage of Great Britain on 2 May 1795 for John Dryden. Born John Turner, he was the second son of the second Baronet of the 1733 creation and the husband of the niece and heiress of the seventh and last Baronet of the 1619 creation. In 1791 he assumed by sign-manual the surname and arms of Dryden only. The fourth Baronet succeeded as seventh Baronet of Ambrosden in 1874.

Dryden baronets, of Canons Ashby (1619)

Sir Erasmus Dryden, 1st Baronet (1553–1632)
Sir John Dryden, 2nd Baronet (–c. 1658)
Sir Robert Dryden, 3rd Baronet (c. 1638–1708)
Sir John Dryden, 4th Baronet (c. 1635–1710)
Sir Erasmus Henry Dryden, 5th Baronet (1669–1710)
Sir Erasmus Dryden, 6th Baronet (1636–1718)
Sir John Dryden, 7th Baronet (c. 1704–1770)

Turner, later Page-Turner, later Dryden baronets, of Ambrosden (1733)

Sir Edward Turner, 1st Baronet (1691–1735)
Sir Edward Turner, 2nd Baronet (1719–1766)
Sir Gregory Page-Turner, 3rd Baronet (1748–1805)
Sir Gregory Osborne Page-Turner, 4th Baronet (1785–1843)
Sir Edward George Thomas Page-Turner, 5th Baronet (1789–1846)
Sir Edward Henry Page-Turner, 6th Baronet (1823–1874)
Sir Henry Edward Leigh Dryden, 7th Baronet (1818–1899) (also 4th Baronet of Canons Ashby, from 1837)
see below for further succession

Dryden baronets, of Canons Ashby (1795)
Sir John Dryden, 1st Baronet (1752–1797)
Sir John Edmund Dryden, 2nd Baronet (1782–1818)
Sir Henry Dryden, 3rd Baronet (1787–1837)
Sir Henry Edward Leigh Dryden, 4th Baronet (1818–1899) (succeeded as seventh Baronet of Ambrosden in 1874)
 see below for further succession

Dryden baronets, of Canons Ashby and of Ambrosden, since 1874

NB, this is not a separate creation, merely a unified listing of the succession to the above two baronetcies.

Sir Henry Edward Leigh Dryden, 4th and 7th Baronet (1818–1899)
Sir Alfred Erasmus Dryden, 5th and 8th Baronet (1822–1912)
Sir Arthur Dryden, 6th and 9th Baronet (1852–1938)
Sir Noel Percy Hugh Dryden, 7th and 10th Baronet (1910–1970)
Sir John Stephen Gyles Dryden, 8th and 11th Baronet (1943–2022)
Sir John Frederick Simon Dryden, 9th and 12th Baronet (born 1976)

The heir apparent to the baronetcy is William Frederick John Dryden (born 2012), only son of the 9th/12th Baronet.

Notes

References 
Kidd, Charles, Williamson, David (editors). Debrett's Peerage and Baronetage (1990 edition). New York: St Martin's Press, 1990, 

 
Baronetcies in the Baronetage of Great Britain
Extinct baronetcies in the Baronetage of England
1619 establishments in England
1733 establishments in Great Britain